The Kalachuris (IAST: Kalacuri), also known as Kalachuris of Mahishmati, were an Indian dynasty that ruled in west-central India between 6th and 7th centuries. They are also known as the Haihayas or as the Early Kalachuris to distinguish them from their later namesakes, especially the Kalachuris of Tripuri.

The Kalachuri territory included parts of present-day Gujarat, Madhya Pradesh, and Maharashtra. Their capital was probably located at Mahishmati. Epigraphic and numismatic evidence suggests that the earliest of the Ellora and Elephanta cave monuments were built during the Kalachuri rule.

The origin of the dynasty is uncertain. In the 6th century, the Kalachuris gained control of the territories formerly ruled by the Guptas, the Vakatakas and the Vishnukundinas. Only three Kalachuri kings are known from inscriptional evidence: Shankaragana, Krishnaraja, and Buddharaja. The Kalachuris lost their power to the Chalukyas of Vatapi in the 7th century. One theory connects the later Kalachuri dynasties of Tripuri and Kalyani to the Kalachuris of Mahishmati.

Territory 

According to the Kalachuri inscriptions, the dynasty controlled Ujjayini, Vidisha and Anandapura. Literary references suggest that their capital was located at Mahishmati in the Malwa region.

The dynasty also controlled Vidarbha, where they succeeded the Vakataka and the Vishnukundina dynasties.

In addition, the Kalachuris conquered northern Konkan (around Elephanta) by the mid-6th century. Here, they succeeded the Traikutaka dynasty.

History 
The origin of the Kalachuris is uncertain.

Krishnaraja 
Krishnaraja (r. c. 550-575) is the earliest known ruler of the dynasty. He issued coins featuring Brahmi script legends, imitating the design of earlier coins issued by the Traikutaka and the Gupta kings. His coins featuring a bull are based on the coins issued by Skandagupta. His silver coins were circulated widely for around 150 years after his reign.

Krishnaraja's coins describe him as Parama-Maheshvara (devotee of Shiva). An inscription of his son Shankaragana states that he was devoted to Pashupati (Shiva) since his birth. Historical evidence suggests that he may have commissioned the Shaivite monuments at the Elephanta Caves and the earliest of the Brahmanical caves at Ellora, where his coins have been discovered.

Shankaragana 

Shankaragana (r. c. 575-600) is the earliest ruler of the dynasty to be attested by his own inscriptions, which were issued from Ujjain and Nirgundipadraka. His Ujjain grant is the earliest epigraphic record of the dynasty.

Shakaragana's adopted the titles of the Gupta emperor Skandagupta. This suggests that he conquered western Malwa, which was formerly under the Gupta authority. His kingdom probably also included parts of the present-day Gujarat.

Like his father, Shankaragana described himself as a Parama-Maheshvara (devotee of Shiva).

Buddharaja 

Buddharaja is the last known ruler of the early Kalachuri dynasty. He was a son of Shankaragana.

Buddharaja conquered eastern Malwa, but he probably lost western Malwa to the ruler of Vallabhi. During his reign, the Chalukya king Mangalesha attacked the Kalachuri kingdom from the south, sometime after 600 CE. The invasion did not result in a complete conquest, as evident by Buddharaja's 609-610 CE (360 KE) Vidisha and 610-611 CE (361 KE) Anandapura grants. Buddharaja probably lost his sovereignty during a second Chalukya invasion, by Mangalesha, or by his nephew Pulakeshin II. The Chalukya inscriptions mention that Mangalesha defeated the Kalachuris, but do not credit Pulakeshin with this achievement; therefore, it is likely that Mangalesha was the Chalukya ruler responsible for ending the Kalachuri power.

Like his father and grandfather, Buddharaja described himself as a Parama-Maheshvara (devotee of Shiva). His queen Ananta-Mahayi belonged to the Pashupata sect.

Descendants 

No concrete information is available about the successors of Buddharaja, but it is known that by 687 CE, the Kalachuris had become feudatories of the Chalukyas.

An inscription issued by a prince named Taralasvamin was found at Sankheda (where one of Shankaragana's grants was also found). This inscription describes Taralasvamin as a devotee of Shiva, and his father Maharaja Nanna as a member of the "Katachchuri" family. The inscription is dated to the year 346 of an unspecified era. Assuming the era as Kalachuri era, Taralasvamin would have been a contemporary of Shankaragana. However, Taralasvamin and Nanna are not mentioned in other Kalachuri records. Also, unlike other Kalachuri inscriptions, the date in this inscription is mentioned in decimal numbers. Moreover, some expressions in the inscription appear to have been borrowed from the 7th century Sendraka inscriptions. Because of these evidences, V. V. Mirashi considered Taralasvamin's inscription as a spurious one.

V. V. Mirashi connected the Kalachuris of Tripuri to the early Kalachuri dynasty. He theorizes that the early Kalachuris moved their capital from Mahishmati to Kalanjara, and from there to Tripuri.

Cultural contributions

Elephanta 

The Elephanta Caves which contain Shaivite monuments are located along the Konkan coast, on the Elephanta Island near Mumbai. Historical evidence suggests that these monuments are associated with Krishnaraja, who was also a Shaivite.

The Kalachuris appear to have been the rulers of the Konkan coast, when some of the Elephanta monuments were built.  Silver coins of Krishnaraja have been found along the Konkan coast, on the Salsette Island (now part of Mumbai) and in the Nashik district. Around 31 of his copper coins have been found on the Elephanta Island, which suggests that he was the patron of the main cave temple on the island. According to numismatist Shobhana Gokhale, these low-value coins may have been used to pay the wages of the workers involved in the cave excavation.

Ellora 

The earliest of the Hindu caves at Ellora appear to have been built during the Kalachuri reign, and possibly under Kalachuri patronage. For example, the Ellora Cave No. 29 shows architectural and iconographic similarities with the Elephanta Caves. The earliest coin found at Ellora, in front of Cave No. 21 (Rameshvara), was issued by Krishnaraja.

Rulers 

The following are the known rulers of the Kalachuri dynasty of Malwa with their estimated reigns (IAST names in brackets):

 Krishnaraja (Kṛṣṇarāja), r. c. 550-575 CE
 Shankaragana (Śaṃkaragaṇa), r. c. 575-600 CE
 Buddharaja (Buddharāja), r. c. 600-625 CE

See also 
 Kalachuri Era, used by the Kalachuris and so named after them

References 
{
	"type": "FeatureCollection",
	"features": [
		{
			"type": "Feature",
			"properties": { "marker-symbol": "monument", "title": "Abhona" },
			"geometry": { "type": "Point", "coordinates": [73.9271644, 20.4796816] }
		},
		{
			"type": "Feature",
			"properties": { "marker-symbol": "monument", "title": "Sankheda", "description": "Also known as Sankhera" },
			"geometry": { "type": "Point", "coordinates": [73.5814967, 22.1715494] }
		},
		{
			"type": "Feature",
			"properties": { "marker-symbol": "monument", "title": "Sarsavani", "description": "Also known as Sarsavni" },
			"geometry": { "type": "Point", "coordinates": [73.2352525, 20.7275464] }
		},
		{
			"type": "Feature",
			"properties": { "marker-symbol": "monument", "title": "Ujjain" },
			"geometry": { "type": "Point", "coordinates": [75.7849097, 23.1793013] }
		},
		{
			"type": "Feature",
			"properties": { "marker-symbol": "monument", "title": "Vadnagar", "description": "Also known as Anandapura" },
			"geometry": { "type": "Point", "coordinates": [72.6165643, 23.7757259] }
		},
		{
			"type": "Feature",
			"properties": { "marker-symbol": "monument", "title": "Vadner" },
			"geometry": { "type": "Point", "coordinates": [74.5170319, 19.4478632] }
		},
		{
			"type": "Feature",
			"properties": { "marker-symbol": "monument", "title": "Vidisha" },
			"geometry": { "type": "Point", "coordinates": [77.8081363, 23.5251102] }
		},
		{
			"type": "Feature",
			"properties": { "marker-symbol": "star", "title": "Mahishmati", "description": "No Kalachuri inscriptions have been found at Mahishmati, but literary evidence suggests that it was the dynasty's capital.", "comment": "Mandhata; Maheshwar is fairly close", "marker-color": "000080" },
			"geometry": { "type": "Point", "coordinates": [76.1522879, 22.2507773] }
		}
	]
}

Bibliography

Further reading

External links

Coins of the Early Kalachuris

History of Gujarat
History of Madhya Pradesh
History of Maharashtra
Dynasties of India